In cryptography, CryptMT is a stream cipher algorithm which internally uses the Mersenne twister. It was developed by Makoto Matsumoto, Mariko Hagita, Takuji Nishimura and Mutsuo Saito and is patented. It has been submitted to the eSTREAM project of the eCRYPT network. 

In that submission to eSTREAM, the authors also included another cipher named Fubuki, which also uses the Mersenne twister.

External links
 eStream page on CryptMT
 CryptMT author's page

Stream ciphers